Hanstruepera crassostreae is a Gram-negative, aerobic, rod-shaped and non-motile bacterium from the genus of Hanstruepera which has been isolated from a oyster from Weihai.

References 

Flavobacteria
Bacteria described in 2018